Bor is a city and a county in the central region of South Sudan. Jonglei State also has its headquarters in Bor. By 1906, Bor District was part Mongalla Province but later transferred to Upper Nile Province.  In 1909–1910, people started resettling along the northern border of the Bor-Duk district, with the aim of separating Nuer and Dinka communities, who had formerly lived together.  The Bor-Duk district was later redesignated "Bor County," divided into two in August 2001, and then divided into three counties in 2003: Bor County, Twic East County, and Duk County.  Greater Bor refers to the entirety of the former Bor-Duk District, from  Cuei-keer in Kolnyang, to the south, to Cuei-thon in the former Duk County, to the north.

Bor County comprises five Payams, namely: Kolnyang, Anyidi, Makuach, Baidit and Jalle.  It is bordered by Twi East And Duk counties to the north, Lake State to the west, Pibor to the east,  Central and Eastern Equatoria States, to the south.  In 2016 Bor County was sub-divided into Bor Payam and five counties, each containing a single payam.  These division were Bor County (Kolnyang Payam), Bor East County (Anyidi Payam), Bor Central County (Makuach Payam), Bor West County (Baidit Payam), and Bor North County (Jalle Payam).

References 

Counties of South Sudan
Jonglei State